Milliken v. Meyer, 311 U.S. 457 (1940), was a U.S. legal case in which both parties were residents of Wyoming. However, the defendant, Meyer, at the time of the suit was served personally in Colorado. In the subsequent trial he collaterally challenged the ruling in WY citing the court's previous holding in Pennoyer v Neff. The U.S. Supreme Court found that individuals can be sued in the state of their domicile for all claims.

References

External links
 

United States Supreme Court cases
1940 in United States case law
United States Supreme Court cases of the Hughes Court